Varanus rainerguentheri, commonly known as Rainer Günther's monitor, is a species of lizard in the family Varanidae. The species is endemic to the Moluccas.

Taxonomy
Varanus rainerguentheri is a member of the "mangrove monitor species-complex". V. rainerguentheri was described in 2007 from specimens originally designated as Varanus indicus from the island of Halmahera in the northern Moluccas, Indonesia. It was distinguished based on differences in pattern and well as molecular studies.

Etymology
The specific name, rainerguentheri, is in honor of German herpetologist Rainer Günther.

Description
Average adult total length (including tail) of V. rainerguentheri is up to three feet (1 metre), though specimens close to five feet (1.6 metres) have been observed.  The background color is dark greyish-black. The dorsal pattern consists of ocelli with yellow centers, arranged in transverse rows. The ventral surface is cream to greyish in color. The ventral surface possesses faint bands and the throat is unpatterned. The tongue is pink with a dark tip.

Geographic range
Varanus rainerguentheri was originally described from Halmahera, where it is now known to occur throughout the island. It is also found on the islands of Morotai, Ternate, Tidore, Gebe, Bacan, Kasiruta, and Obi. Its range was later expanded to include Buru, and it is likely to prove to be even more widespread throughout the Moluccas.

Habitat
Varanus rainerguentheri mainly inhabits coastal environments including mangroves, thus filling an ecological niche similar to that held by the mangrove monitor (Varanus indicus) elsewhere. Little is known about the specific ecology and habits of V. rainerguentheri, though it is known to feed mainly on aquatic prey.

References

Further reading
Somma M, Koch A (2012). "New morphological and distributional data of Varanus rainerguentheri Ziegler, Böhme & Schmitz, 2007 (Squamata: Varanidae), an endemic and little-known monitor lizard species of the Moluccas, Indonesia". Salamandra 48: 207-212.
Weijola VSA (2010). "Geographical distribution and habitat use of monitor lizards of the north Moluccas". Biawak 4 (1): 7-23. (http://www.varanidae.org/Vol4_No1.pdf)
Ziegler T, Böhme W, Schmitz A (2007). "A new species of the Varanus indicus group (Squamata, Varanidae) from Halmahera Island, Moluccas: morphological and molecular evidence". Mitteilungen aus dem Museum für Naturkunde in Berlin, Zool. 83  (Supplement): 109-119. (Varanus rainerguentheri, new species).

Varanus
Endemic fauna of Indonesia
Reptiles of Indonesia
Reptiles described in 2007